The England Boxing National Amateur Championships Heavyweight Championship formerly known as the ABA Championships is the primary English amateur boxing championship. It had previously been contested by all the nations of the United Kingdom.

History
The heavyweight division is the newest division only being inaugurated in 1998 and is currently contested in the under-92 Kg weight division. The championships are highly regarded in the boxing world and seen as the most prestigious national amateur championships.

Past winners

+ Reported as Richard Frost-Smith on England Boxing website but believed to be Robert Frost-Smith.

References

England Boxing